In the United Kingdom there are many regulations relevant to health and safety at work. Many of these give effect to European Union directives.

Regulations made under the Health and Safety at Work etc. Act 1974
Breach of the regulations is a crime throughout the UK. In England and Wales contravention is punishable on summary conviction or on indictment with an unlimited fine. Either an individual or a corporation can be punished, and sentencing practice is published by the Sentencing Guidelines Council. 

In England and Wales, a person who suffered damage caused by a breach of the regulations, used to have a cause of action in tort against the offender. However, section 69 of the Enterprise and Regulatory Reform Act 2013 repealed this right of action. This prevents a claimant for claiming damages against an employer for contravention of an absolute duty. Instead, they must now prove that the employer was negligent as with other torts. A similar right of action exists in Scotland through the law of delict.

The "six pack" regulations

Management of Health and Safety at Work Regulations 1999
Provision and Use of Work Equipment Regulations 1998
Manual Handling Operations Regulations 1992
Workplace (Health, Safety and Welfare) Regulations 1992
Personal Protective Equipment at Work Regulations 1992
Health and Safety (Display Screen Equipment) Regulations 1992

Worker consultation
Safety Representatives and Safety Committees Regulations 1977
Health and Safety (Consultation with Employees) Regulations 1996
Both of these (as amended) are supported by Approved Codes of Practice and guidance issued by the Health and Safety Executive (HSE).
Offshore Installations (Safety Representatives and Safety Committees) Regulations 1989

Other
Dangerous Substances in Harbour Areas Regulations 1987
Electricity at Work Regulations 1989
Borehole Sites and Operations Regulations 1995 (S.I. 1995/2038)
The Confined Spaces Regulations 1997 (S.I. 1997/1713)
Lifting Operations and Lifting Equipment Regulations 1998
Transport of Dangerous Goods (Safety Advisers) Regulations
Ionising Radiations Regulations 1999
Pressure Equipment Regulations 1999
Pressure Systems Safety Regulations 2000 (PSSR, SI 2000/128), replacing the earlier Pressure Systems and Transportable Gas Containers Regulations 1989, came into force on 21 February 2000
Dangerous Substances and Explosive Atmospheres Regulations 2002
Chemicals (Hazard Information and Packaging for Supply) Regulations 2002 (CHIP) (gives effect to EU Directive 67/548/EEC)
Control of Lead at Work Regulations 2002
Control of Substances Hazardous to Health Regulations 2002
The Work at Height Regulations 2005
The Control of Noise at Work Regulations 2005
Control of Vibration at Work Regulations 2005
The Control of Asbestos Regulations 2012
Reporting of Injuries, Diseases and Dangerous Occurrences Regulations 2013
Acetylene Safety (England and Wales and Scotland) Regulations 2014 (S.I. 2014/1639)
The Construction (Design and Management) Regulations 2015
Control of Major Accident Hazards Regulations 2015
Ionising Radiation (Medical Exposure) Regulations 2017 (S.I 2017/1322)
The Radiation (Emergency Preparedness and Public Information) Regulations 2019.

A full list of all UK Health and Safety legislation can be found on the HSE website.

Statutory inspection
A number of statutes require a "thorough inspection" to take place at prescribed intervals. The HSE describes a thorough inspection as "a systematic and detailed examination of the equipment and safety-critical parts, carried out at specified intervals by a competent person who must then complete a written report". The main statutory inspection regulations are:

REACH

The registration, evaluation, authorisation and restriction of chemicals in the UK reflects the EU REACH regulation (EC 1907/2006).

Having entered into force in 2007, REACH provisions were phased in over a period of 11 years.

Notes

References

Regulations
Safety codes
Statutory Instruments of the United Kingdom